Marlene Rose (born December 5, 1967) is an American glass sculptor. She specializes in sandcast glass work, a method inspired by bronze casting, and is a pioneer of the glass art equivalent.

Early life and education
Rose graduated from Tulane University, acquiring a Bachelor of Fine Arts with Honors in Glass. She then acquired a Master of Fine Arts at the California College of Arts and Crafts. She also studied at the Pilchuck Glass School founded by Dale Chihuly and Anne Gould Hauberg.

As she was starting her glass artistry, Rose recalls seeing many functional pieces, such as kitchenware, made from glass and thinking, “There wasn’t a statement. There wasn’t an expression, a communication, with this shape.” This helped further actualize her eventual predilection toward glass sculpture. Rose is among the first artists to use traditional bronze casting methods with glass, having used and developed such practices since the 1980s.

Career
In 2007, Rose was awarded a National Endowment for the Arts grant.

In 2016, Rose opened the Marlene Rose Gallery in Clearwater, Florida, which is the first gallery created for the sole purpose of exhibiting her artwork.

On September 29, 2019, Rose was featured on a segment of CBS News Sunday Morning titled "Glass Cast in Sand", where she was interviewed by Lee Cowan.

Technique
Rose's usual glass-making technique is inspired by bronze casting. Rose pours molten glass – which she refers to as "lava" – into a sand mold, then waits upwards of six days for her pieces to cool in the oven before removing the piece from the mold.

Rose is strongly inspired by artistic traditions and past civilizations of African and Asian origin. Frequent motifs in her sculptures include Buddha heads and butterflies.

Personal
She currently resides in Clearwater, Florida, where her gallery is based.

She is married to architect Thomas Coates.

Selected works
2008: "Crimson Door": cast glass and wrought iron
2011: "Buddha Wall": glass, steel, and copper
2011: "Merlot Compass Rose Butterfly": sandcast glass, steel, copper
2014: "Electric Blue Lady Cecile": sandcast steel, copper
2015: "Polka Dot Buddha": sandcast glass, steel
2016: "Bearded Boy": sandcast glass, steel
2016: "Large Festival Mask": sandcast glass, steel
2016: "Merlot Bell with Torii": sandcast glass, steel
2016: "Rose Cherry Blossom": sandcast glass, steel
2017: "Fountain Buddha": sandcast glass
2020: "Air to Water Buddha": sandcast glass, steel
2020: "Aqua O With Roofing Nails": sandcast glass
2020: "Double Pointy Bell Tower": sandcast glass, steel

Exhibitions

January 10 to February 23, 2014: Morean Arts Center, "Keep It Glassy, St. Pete!: Glass in the Sunshine City", Tampa, Florida
2015: Arvada Center for the Arts and Humanities, "Fired: Glass", Arvada, Colorado
2019: Fort Wayne Museum of Art, Marlene Rose: Cultural Blueprints, Fort Wayne, Indiana
National Gallery of Foreign Art, Sofia, Bulgaria

References

External links
Official Website
Marlene Rose at Facebook
Marlene Rose at Instagram

1967 births
20th-century American sculptors
21st-century American sculptors
American stained glass artists and manufacturers
Women glass artists
Living people
American glass artists